Julien Dobbelaere (22 February 1921 – 19 August 1961) was a Belgian wrestler. He competed in the men's Greco-Roman welterweight at the 1948 Summer Olympics.

References

External links
 

1921 births
1961 deaths
Belgian male sport wrestlers
Olympic wrestlers of Belgium
Wrestlers at the 1948 Summer Olympics
Sportspeople from Ghent